The 69th Primetime Emmy Awards honored the best in US prime time television programming from June 1, 2016, until May 31, 2017, as chosen by the Academy of Television Arts & Sciences. The ceremony was held on Sunday, September 17, 2017, at the Microsoft Theater in Downtown Los Angeles, California, and was broadcast in the U.S. by CBS. The ceremony was hosted by Stephen Colbert. The 69th Primetime Creative Arts Emmy Awards were held on September 9 and 10, and was broadcast by FXX on September 16.

The nominations were announced by Anna Chlumsky and Shemar Moore on July 13, 2017. Channelwise, the freshman HBO science fiction western drama Westworld and NBC sketch comedy Saturday Night Live were the most nominated programs, each with 22 nominations.

Host Stephen Colbert opened the ceremony with a song-and-dance number and a monologue that lampooned the state of the world under President Donald Trump, which The New York Times said set an anti-Trump tone for the rest of the event. Many of the further presentations and host commentary continued jokes aimed towards Trump, along with winners' speeches criticizing the President and standing behind diversity in the television field. Sean Spicer, Trump's former White House Press Secretary, made an appearance in which he parodied himself. RuPaul played a living Emmy statue in a comedic interview segment with Colbert during the ceremony.

Original programming streaming television services—Netflix and Hulu—upended traditional broadcast television series in several categories. Netflix series earned a total of 20 Primetime Emmy Awards, following only HBO with 29 and leading NBC with 15. Hulu's The Handmaid's Tale became the first web series to win Outstanding Drama Series. Additionally, streaming television also won their first awards for Outstanding Lead Actress in a Drama Series (Elisabeth Moss for The Handmaid's Tale – Hulu), Outstanding Guest Actress in a Drama Series (Alexis Bledel for The Handmaid's Tale – Hulu), Outstanding Writing for a Drama Series (Bruce Miller for The Handmaid's Tale – Hulu), Outstanding Television Movie (Black Mirror: San Junipero – Netflix), and Outstanding Writing for a Limited Series, Movie, or Dramatic Special (Charlie Brooker for Black Mirror: San Junipero – Netflix).

In addition, the night saw several other historic firsts: Donald Glover became the first African-American to win Outstanding Directing for a Comedy Series for Atlanta. Riz Ahmed, with his win for Outstanding Lead Actor in a Limited Series or Movie for The Night Of, became the first Asian to win that category as well as the first Asian male to win an acting award and first South Asian to win a lead acting award. Moreover, Ahmed and Dave Chappelle also became the first Muslims to win acting awards, with Ahmed being the first Muslim to win a lead acting award and Chappelle the first to win for a guest role for Saturday Night Live. With Aziz Ansari and Lena Waithe winning Outstanding Writing for a Comedy Series for Master of None, Waithe became the first African-American female to win that award. Finally, Julia Louis-Dreyfus won her record sixth consecutive award for Outstanding Lead Actress in a Comedy Series for the same category for the same role in a single series as Selina Meyer on Veep; she is now tied with Cloris Leachman for the most wins as a performer.

The awards ceremony drew 11.4 million viewers, on par with the previous awards ceremony, but one of the lowest viewerships for the Primetime Emmy Awards overall. Analysts attribute this to younger audiences preferring to watch clips or summaries than the entire event and to Florida markets being affected by Hurricane Irma.

Winners and nominees

Winners are listed first, highlighted in boldface, and indicated with a double dagger (‡). For simplicity, producers who received nominations for program awards, as well as nominated writers for Outstanding Writing for a Variety Series, have been omitted.

Programs
{| class="wikitable"
|+ 
|-
| style="vertical-align:top;" width="50%" | 
 Veep (HBO)
 Atlanta (FX)
 Black-ish (ABC)
 Master of None (Netflix)
 Modern Family (ABC)
 Silicon Valley (HBO)
 Unbreakable Kimmy Schmidt (Netflix)
| style="vertical-align:top;" width="50%" | 
 The Handmaid's Tale (Hulu)
 Better Call Saul (AMC)
 The Crown (Netflix)
 House of Cards (Netflix)
 Stranger Things (Netflix)
 This Is Us (NBC)
 Westworld (HBO)
|-
| style="vertical-align:top;" width="50%" | 
 Last Week Tonight with John Oliver (HBO)
 Full Frontal with Samantha Bee (TBS)
 Jimmy Kimmel Live! (ABC)
 The Late Late Show with James Corden (CBS)
 The Late Show with Stephen Colbert (CBS)
 Real Time with Bill Maher (HBO)
| style="vertical-align:top;" width="50%" | 
 Saturday Night Live (NBC)
 Billy on the Street (truTV)
 Documentary Now! (IFC)
 Drunk History (Comedy Central)
 Portlandia (IFC)
 Tracey Ullman's Show (HBO)
|-
| style="vertical-align:top;" width="50%" | 
 Big Little Lies (HBO)
 Fargo (FX)
 Feud: Bette and Joan (FX)
 Genius (Nat Geo)
 The Night Of (HBO)
| style="vertical-align:top;" width="50%" | 
 Black Mirror: San Junipero (Netflix)
 Dolly Parton's Christmas of Many Colors: Circle of Love (NBC)
 The Immortal Life of Henrietta Lacks (HBO)
 Sherlock: The Lying Detective (PBS)
 The Wizard of Lies (HBO)
|-
| style="vertical-align:top;" width="50%" colspan="2" | 
 The Voice (NBC)
 The Amazing Race (CBS)
 American Ninja Warrior (NBC)
 Project Runway (Lifetime)
 RuPaul's Drag Race (VH1) Top Chef (Bravo)
|}

Acting
Lead performances

Supporting performances

Directing

Writing

Most major nominations
By network
 HBO – 46
 FX / Netflix – 27
 NBC – 17
 ABC – 11
 CBS / Hulu – 7
 Showtime – 6
 AMC – 5
 TBS – 4
 Amazon – 3

By program
 Feud: Bette and Joan (FX) / Veep (HBO) – 10
 Big Little Lies (HBO) / The Night Of (HBO) – 8
 The Handmaid's Tale (Hulu) / Saturday Night Live (NBC) / Westworld (HBO) – 7
 Fargo (FX) – 6
 Atlanta (FX) / Better Call Saul (AMC) / The Crown (Netflix) / Stranger Things (Netflix) / This Is Us (NBC) – 5
 Full Frontal with Samantha Bee (TBS) / House of Cards (Netflix) / Silicon Valley (HBO) – 4
 The Americans (FX) / Black-ish (ABC) / Genius (NatGeo) / Last Week Tonight with John Oliver (HBO) / The Late Show with Stephen Colbert (CBS) / Master of None (Netflix) / Transparent (Amazon) / Unbreakable Kimmy Schmidt (Netflix) / The Wizard of Lies (HBO) – 3

Most major awards
By network
 HBO – 10
 NBC – 6
 Hulu – 5
 Netflix – 4
 FX – 2

By program
 Big Little Lies (HBO) / The Handmaid's Tale (Hulu) – 5
 Saturday Night Live (NBC) – 4
 Atlanta (FX) / Black Mirror: San Junipero (Netflix) / Last Week Tonight with John Oliver (HBO) / Veep'' (HBO) – 2

Presenters and performers
The awards were presented by the following:

Presenters

Performers

In Memoriam
Broadway actor Christopher Jackson performed Stevie Wonder's "As" as images of television personalities who died in the past year were shown in the following order.

 Glen Campbell
 June Foray
 Ed Greene
 John Bernecker
 Mike Connors
 Zsa Zsa Gabor
 Chuck Barris
 Chris Bearde
 Brad Grey
 Frank Konigsberg
 Powers Boothe
 Jeannie Gunn
 Adam West
 John Heard
 Gary Glasberg
 Roger Ailes
 Agnes Nixon
 Robert Osborne
 Jay Thomas
 Nelsan Ellis
 Mark Schlegel
 Norman Brokaw
 Marsh McCall
 Don Ohlmeyer
 Robert Vaughn
 Bill Paxton
 Roger Moore
 Carrie Fisher
 Debbie Reynolds
 John Hurt
 Gwen Ifill
 Grant Tinker
 Stanley Kallis
 Sandy Gallin
 Miguel Ferrer
 Martin Landau
 Richard Hatch
 Alan Thicke
 Florence Henderson
 Jerry Lewis
 Don Rickles
 Mary Tyler Moore

Notes

References

External links
 Emmys.com list of 2017 Nominees & Winners
 Academy of Television Arts and Sciences website
 

069
2017 in American television
2017 in Los Angeles
2017 awards in the United States
2017 television awards
September 2017 events in the United States
Television shows directed by Glenn Weiss